Aruba first competed at the Olympic Games in 1988, and has participated in each Summer Olympic Games since then.  Aruba has yet to win any Olympic medals.

Between 1952 until 1984, Aruban athletes competed as part of the Netherlands Antilles. This arrangement changed, when Aruba became a separate entity ("land") of Kingdom of the Netherlands in 1986. The Aruban Olympic Committee was formed in 1985 and recognized in 1986. As of January 2021, Aruba had not competed in any Winter Olympic Games.

Participation

Timeline of participation

Medal tables

Medals by Summer Games

Flagbearers

See also
 Netherlands Antilles at the Olympics

External links
 
 
 

 
Festivals in Aruba